The United States Department of Defense has a large number of temporary military bases in Iraq, most a type of forward operating base (FOB).

Depending on their size or utility, the installations were called: Camp, Forward Operating Base (FOB), Contingency Operating Base (COB), Contingency Operating Site (COS), Combat Outpost (COP), Patrol Base (PB), Outpost, Logistic Base (Log Base), Fire Base (FB), Convoy Support Center (CSC), Logistic Support Area (LSA) and Joint Security Station (JSS).

Near the end of Occupation of Iraq (2003–2011), the last several Camps and Forward Operating Bases were changed to Contingency Operating Bases and Sites.

At the height of the occupation, the United States had 239,000 men and women in uniform stationed in 505 bases throughout Iraq. Another 135,000 contractors were also working in Iraq.

Due to International military intervention against ISIL, personnel have returned to old bases and new bases created. Control of many U.S.-operated bases was transferred to the Iraqi government during the 2020–2021 U.S. troop withdrawal.

Airfields

Camps

Combat Outpost (COP)

Contingency Operating Base (COB)

Contingency Operating Site (COS)

Firebase (FB)

Forward Operating Base (FOB)

Joint Base (JB)

Joint Security Station (JSS)

Patrol Base (PB)

Other nomenclatures

Victory Base Complex (VBC), a cluster of installations surrounding the Baghdad International Airport (BIAP). Successively headquarters for Multi-National Force - Iraq and United States Forces - Iraq.
 al-Faw Palace, part of the Victory Base Complex, headquarters of the United States Forces - Iraq in Baghdad

References

External links
 Map of Army Installations in Iraq
 Iraq facilities on www.globalsecurity.org 

 
United States Army lists